The  is a kei car with sliding doors sold by Daihatsu between November 2014 and August 2022. The vehicle was previewed by Deca Deca concept cars that were shown at 2009 and 2013 Tokyo Motor Shows.

Gallery

Wake

Pixis Mega

Hijet Caddie

Deca Deca

References

External links 

  (Wake)
  (Pixis Mega)

Wake
Cars introduced in 2014
2020s cars
Microvans
Front-wheel-drive vehicles
All-wheel-drive vehicles
Vehicles with CVT transmission